Grand Turk Island is an island in the Turks and Caicos Islands. Grand Turk contains the territory's capital, Cockburn Town, and the JAGS McCartney International Airport. The island is the administrative, historic, cultural and financial center of the territory and has the second-largest population of the islands at approximately 4,831 people in 2012.

The name comes from a species of cactus on the island, the Turk's Cap Cactus (Melocactus intortus), which has a distinctive cap, reminiscent of an Ottoman fez.

History 
The Lucayan people were the indigenous people of the island, who called it Abawana, meaning "the First Small Land". The Spanish later called it Amuana.

Grand Turk was first colonised in 1681 by Bermudians, who set up the salt industry in the islands. In 1766 it became the capital of the country.  For some time, at least until the early 19th century, Grand Turk was often referred to as Grand Cay, not to be confused with either Grand Cay in the Bahamas or Grand Cayman.

Grand Turk Lighthouse 
Grand Turk Lighthouse was erected in 1852 near northern end of the island. The  lighthouse was designed by Alexander Gordon and built by Chance Brothers in England. It was shipped in pieces and assembled on Grand Turk.

Columbus landfall theory
Grand Turk has been put forward as the possible landfall island of Christopher Columbus during his first voyage to the New World in 1492. San Salvador Island or Samana Cay in the Bahamas is traditionally identified with Guanahani, the site of Columbus' first landfall, but some believe that studies of Columbus' journals show that his descriptions of Guanahani much more closely fit Grand Turk than they do other candidates. Magnetic variations that caused misreadings in Columbus' compasses demonstrate that several of the recorded moorings using a rope-secured anchor to a clear sandy bottom would not have been possible had Columbus sailed from the islands of the Bahamas.

On the contrary, historian Gregory McIntosh  has concluded that Grand Turk was not Guanahani but Babueca, an island separately discovered by Martín Alonso Pinzón in November - December 1492.

U.S. Military presence

Naval Facility Grand Turk
A U.S. Naval Facility (NAVFAC), the name given for a shore terminus of an offshore surveillance array of the Sound Surveillance System (SOSUS), was established on Grand Turk in 1954 as one of three additional Atlantic systems installed that year during the first phase of SOSUS installation. The facility was commissioned 23 October 1954 and was active until decommissioned 31 March 1980. The actual undersea surveillance mission of the system and shore facility remained classified through decommissioning. The NAVFAC was located  near the Grand Turk Lighthouse.

Missile Impact Location System
In addition to the precise target array the facility was the terminus of one of the Broad Ocean Area (BOA) MILS that could give good location data over large ocean areas.

Other installations and events
From 1957 to 1959 USN Mobile Construction Battalion 7 constructed a LORAN Station on the island.

In 1962, John Glenn's Friendship 7 Mercury spacecraft landed in the vicinity of Grand Turk Island off the southeast shoreline. A replica of the Friendship 7 is on display in Grand Turk at the entrance to the Grand Turk Island airport.

In 1966 at least five Arcas (All-Purpose Rocket for Collecting Atmospheric Soundings) sounding rockets were launched from Grand Turk Island by the USA.

See also 
 Grand Turk Parade Ground

References

External links
 Grand Turk - Visit Turks and Caicos Islands
 Grandturk.tc
 Grand Turk Chamber of Commerce

 
Turks Islands